Out of the Madness is the second studio album by  American Jazz/Blues/R&B group The Derek Trucks Band, released on October 20, 1998. The album, a mix of blues classics and original compositions by the band, was recorded between June 14, 1997 – April 11, 1998 at Dockside Studios in Maurice, Louisiana. Derek was eighteen years old at the time of the release of the album. In 2008, the album was made available digitally, and is now available on iTunes, and other online retailers like Real, Rhapsody, Yahoo! Music, eMusic, Napster and Puretracks.

Reception

In a review for AllMusic, Cub Koda noted that, in relation to Trucks' debut album, Out of the Madness "puts his playing and music more firmly in Southern American roots music territory," with "more of a jam session feeling... than that of a cohesive album." He concluded: "All in all, a young artist still showing promise."

Geoffrey Himes of The Washington Post called Trucks "a teenage blues guitarist of undeniable virtuosity and an uncertain grasp of the blues gestalt," and stated that the album contains "respectable but workmanlike versions of familiar standards." He commented: "Derek has absorbed a lot in a short time, but he still has a ways to go in matching the graceful jazz-blues-country-rock synthesis of the Allman Brothers."

OffBeat'''s Melissa Crory wrote: "From the opening track, 'Preachin' Blues' to the almost nine-minute scorcher, 'Kickin' Back,' Trucks' ability shines. Ain't no potential about this bluesman, he's already there."

Writing for The Music Box, John Metzger remarked: "Trucks' guitar screams with a powerful and relentless force that seems to draw from an older, wiser spirit... Though Out of the Madness is a little rough around the edges, it's an album that is full of promise."

In an article for Daily Vault, Christopher Thelen described the album as "a testament to the talent of Trucks and his band," and stated: "if you enjoy traditional blues as well as a bit of Southern rock thrown into the mix for texture, then Out Of The Madness'' will be a wonderful addition to your collection."

Track listing

Personnel

The Derek Trucks Band
Derek Trucks - guitar
Todd Smallie - bass
Bill McKay - organ, keyboards
Yonrico Scott - drums, percussion

Additional personnel
Warren Haynes - vocals, guitar
Larry McCray - vocals, guitar
Jimmy Herring - guitar
John Snyder - producer
Matt Tutor - vocals
Tony Daigle - engineer
Jay Newland - engineer
Jim Watts - assistant engineer
Benny Graeff - assistant engineer
Jay Newland - mastering
Jay Newland - mixing
Jim Watts - mixing
Jason Standard - assistant engineer
Flournoy Holmes - cover art, design, photography
K. Tauches - design assistant
Stacey Orzell - photography

References

1998 albums
Derek Trucks albums